Javad Asghari Moghaddam (born 12 August 1979) is an Iranian professional futsal coach and former player. He is currently head coach of Ghand Katrin in the Iranian Futsal Super League.

Honours

Country 
 AFC Futsal Championship
 Champion (3): 2007 - 2008 - 2010
 Confederations Cup
 Champion (1): 2009
 WAFF Futsal Championship
 Champion (1): 2012

Club 
 AFC Futsal Club Championship
 Champion (1): 2010 (Foolad Mahan)
 Third place (1): 2014 (Dabiri)
 Iranian Futsal Super League
 Champions (1): 2013–14 (Dabiri)
 Runners-up (2): 2016–17 (Dabiri) - 2017–18 (Tasisat Daryaei)

Manager 
 Iranian Futsal Super League
 Runners-up (1): 2016–17 (Dabiri)

Individual 
 Top Goalscorer:
 WAFF Futsal Championship: 2012 (8 goals)

References

External links 
 

1979 births
Living people
People from Tonekabon
Sportspeople from Mazandaran province
Iranian men's futsal players
Futsal forwards
Foolad Mahan FSC players
Firooz Sofeh FSC players
Dabiri FSC players
Tasisat Daryaei FSC players
Sunich FSC players
Iranian futsal coaches